Bienvenu Eva Nga (born 17 February 1993) is a Cameroonian professional footballer who plays as a forward for Orlando Pirates in the South African DStv Premiership.

Career
He started his career in Cameroon with semi-professional side Black Stars. After playing for Gabonese side AS Stade Mandji and GD Maputo, ENH de Vilankulo and FC Chibuto in Mozambique, he signed for Liga Portugal 2 side Leixões in 2018. He made 2 league appearances for Leixões. Eva Nga subsequently joined Amora, for who he made 17 appearances, scoring three goals, before joining Moçambola club Costa Do Sol in January 2019, for whom he won the 2019 Moçambola title.

He signed for South African Premier Division side Bidvest Wits in January 2020. He made 14 league appearances for Wits and scored two goals. The club were sold to Tshakhuma Tsha Madzivhandila at the end of the season, and Eva Nga subsequently joined Chippa United. On 3 November 2020, He scored his first goals for Chippa United with a hat-trick in a 3–1 victory over Maritzburg United.

References

1993 births
Living people
Cameroonian footballers
Association football forwards
AS Stade Mandji players
GD Maputo players
FC Chibuto players
Leixões S.C. players
Amora F.C. players
CD Costa do Sol players
Bidvest Wits F.C. players
Chippa United F.C. players
Orlando Pirates F.C. players
Liga Portugal 2 players
Campeonato de Portugal (league) players
Moçambola players
South African Premier Division players
Cameroonian expatriate footballers
Cameroonian expatriate sportspeople in Gabon
Expatriate footballers in Gabon
Cameroonian expatriate sportspeople in Mozambique
Expatriate footballers in Mozambique
Cameroonian expatriate sportspeople in Portugal
Expatriate footballers in Portugal
Cameroonian expatriate sportspeople in South Africa
Expatriate soccer players in South Africa